Northeast Kingdom International Airport, until 2015 the Newport State Airport , is three miles (5 km) southwest of Newport, in Orleans County, Vermont, United States.

Facilities

In 2015 the airport had 9,452 aircraft operations, average 19 per day: 97% general aviation and 3% military. 20 aircraft are based at this airport: 88% single engine and 12% multi-engine.

History 
The city of Newport owned the airport until it sold it to the state of Vermont in the 1970s.

Northeast Airlines DC-3s served Newport from June through September between the years 1955 to 1961 and 1965 to 1967. FH-227s took over in the summer of 1968 but this was the last year the airport had scheduled commercial service. 

On August 14 - August 15, 2004 the airport served as the site of Coventry, the former final live concert appearance by the musical group Phish, attended by tens of thousands of fans.

On January 9, 2012 the state announced its intention to seek Federal approval for an expansion. Other improvements include expanded water and sewer services, a new terminal, new taxiways, and services from the U.S. Customs and Border Protection and the Transportation Security Administration. 

In 2013 Flight Design announced the intention of assembling CTLS planes at the airport from nine pieces, fabricated in Germany. It would employ about 35 workers.

The airport was renamed in 2015 amid development plans for the Northeast Kingdom that included a major FAA funded upgrade to the airport. Runway, taxiway and other airport facility upgrades were completed in 2017.

Outside resort developers had proposed plans for a new passenger terminal, commercial flights and the aircraft assembly plant, but were abandoned in April 2016 when the developers were charged with fraud for misappropriating the funds.

On October 12th 2017 the FAA recognized the State of Vermont's Airport name change from Newport State Airport to Northeast Kingdom International Airport.

References

External links 
Newport State Airport at Vermont Airport Directory

Airports in Vermont

Buildings and structures in Newport (city), Vermont

Transportation buildings and structures in Orleans County, Vermont